Arthur Francis Leach (16 March 1851 – 28 September 1915) was an English historian who wrote a number of books on the development of education in England.
He has been called "the father of the history of education in England".

Life
Leach was born in 1851, the son of Thomas Leach, barrister.
He was educated from 1862 at Highgate School, then at Winchester College and won a scholarship to New College, Oxford, where he obtained a first in Classics.
He won the Stanhope essay prize in 1872, and from 1874 to 1881 was a fellow of All Souls College, Oxford.
He studied law, and became a barrister of the Middle Temple in 1876.
In 1884, Leach became an assistant charity commissioner.

He was asked to investigate the histories of The Prebendal School, Chichester, and Southwell Grammar School.
He found that, contrary to common belief, there had been many such schools in the medieval period that were independent of the monasteries, founded long before the independent schools of the Renaissance and Reformation such as Winchester, Eton College and Warwick School. The exploration of this subject became his life study, and he published many books on his findings while continuing to work at the Charity Commission, where he rose to a senior position before his death in 1915.

Work

Leach's main theses were that English schools had greater antiquity than had been thought, and that the Tudors had not been the major patrons of English education. Between 1894 and 1915 he published nine books on the history of education, based on material from the British Museum, the Public Record Office and local archives; his approach laid the foundation for modern research into the subject. He was, however, sometimes slapdash with dates, opinionated and inclined to ignore aspects that did not interest him, which undermined his reputation. He downplayed the contributions of monastic schools, overestimated the role of chantry schools and failed to explore the curricula of the non-monastic schools.

Leach had an eye for beauty. Several of his works related to Beverley Minster in Yorkshire, of which he said there is no more beautiful building in England. He said it "dominates the landscape with an impressiveness of grandeur that the mother-church of York cannot surpass".

His main focus was on schools of the 16th century or earlier.
He did publish an article on 18th century schools in the Encyclopædia Britannica, but it was dismissive.
He said "Never probably since the 9th century was the condition of the public schools of England worse than in the years 1750 to 1840."
He thought that the fundamental goal of a school in meeting its obligations as a charitable trust was to teach Latin and Greek, and was strongly opposed to non-classical teaching.

Leach pointed out that the history of education differs from the history of opinions about what education should be, and is more than a collection of biographies of prominent teachers.
A modern scholar has said that his The Schools of Medieval England published in 1915, the year of his death, "formed the basis for all subsequent work on medieval and Reformation schooling until the publication of Nicholas Orme.s English Schools in the Middle Ages in 1973". However, the same scholar goes on to say that his claims "were not always sufficiently supported by his sources".

Bibliography

References

Sources

Further reading

External links
 

19th-century English historians
1851 births
1915 deaths
People educated at Highgate School
People educated at Winchester College
Alumni of New College, Oxford
Fellows of All Souls College, Oxford
Members of the Middle Temple
English barristers
19th-century English lawyers
20th-century English historians